Zhou Suying (born 8 December 1960) is a Chinese former cyclist. She competed in the women's sprint event at the 1988 Summer Olympics.

References

External links
 

1960 births
Living people
Chinese female cyclists
Olympic cyclists of China
Cyclists at the 1988 Summer Olympics
Place of birth missing (living people)
Asian Games medalists in cycling
Asian Games gold medalists for China
Cyclists at the 1986 Asian Games
Medalists at the 1986 Asian Games
20th-century Chinese women